The 2013–14 Polska Hokej Liga season was the 79th season of the Polska Liga Hokejowa, the top level of ice hockey in Poland. The league was renamed the Polska Hokej Liga at the start of the season. Nine teams participated in the league, and KH Sanok won the championship. Podhale Nowy Targ was relegated to the 1. Liga, but was able to stay in the PHL after KTH Krynica did not get a league license for 2014-15.

Regular season

Playoffs

External links 
 Polish Ice Hockey Federation
 PHL
 Season on hockeyarchives.info

Polska Hokej Liga seasons
Polska
Polska